Agnar Hagen  is a Norwegian handball player.

He made his debut on the Norwegian national team in 1953, 
and played 12 matches for the national team between 1953 and 1960. He participated at the 1958 World Men's Handball Championship.

References

Year of birth missing (living people)
Living people
Norwegian male handball players